William Haughey, Baron Haughey,  (born 2 July 1956) is a Scottish businessman, philanthropist and chair of City Facilities Management Holdings Ltd.

Career
Haughey had attended Holyrood Secondary School followed by Langside College, and then worked in the refrigeration and air-conditioning industry in Abu Dhabi before returning to Scotland to set up his own business with £70,000 of savings he had accrued. He founded City Refrigeration, a refrigeration equipment and maintenance supplier, with his wife Susan in 1985.

After securing a service contract with the Tennent's company in the 1980s which led to agreements with further breweries, he sold a majority stake to the 3i equity firm. A downturn in the financial situation caused Haughey to sell two other small companies he had established back to City to increase turnover and broaden the range of services provided by the firm. In 1997 the firm signed a deal with Asda to maintain refrigeration equipment in stores throughout the United Kingdom. Due to the success of that venture, Haughey and his wife found themselves able to buy back almost full control of City from 3i in 1999, allowing them to have decisive input on its future strategic direction; a gradual, continuous expansion of its operations followed over the subsequent decades.

Haughey backed the Entrepreneurial Spark start-up accelerator, hosting the Glasgow 'hatchery' in his City Refrigeration Headquarters.

While the City technical division is located in Clydesmill Industrial Estate near to Cambuslang, its corporate headquarters are at Caledonia House in Gorbals, Glasgow, having relocated from nearby Shawfield in 2009 when those premises were demolished for construction of the M74 motorway completion. The new site was virtually on the site of Haughey's childhood home which had been demolished years earlier with the family moving on to the newly built Toryglen neighbourhood a short distance to the south.

By 2017, the company had been rebranded as City Facilities Management and launched a European arm, headquartered in Paris. Their international clients include Coles Supermarkets in Australia.

In 2020, Lord Haughey, who helped rescue Celtic from going into receivership in the early 1990s, flatly rejected suggestions that he was interested in a plan to acquire Rangers.

Personal life and awards
Haughey married Susan in 1978. He has one son Kenny. In his spare time he enjoys playing golf and tournament poker. He once revealed that he winds down every Friday night with a fish supper.

He is a Celtic F.C. season ticket holder and was formerly a non-executive director of the club. He was close friends with former Celtic player Jimmy Johnstone before his death, and is a collector of club memorabilia, much of which (including the medal collections of Johnstone and Tommy Gemmell) he has loaned back to Celtic for display in their museum.

He also provided £2 million in funding to the Scottish Cup while the tournament did not have a main sponsor between 2008 and 2010, with the Scottish Government allowed to use the 'branding space' competition to promote their Homecoming Scotland 2009 and Active Nation initiatives.

He is a huge Oasis fan and has confessed to liking 80s band A-ha after a City employee offered him free tickets to an A-ha concert during the band's 2010 farewell tour.

Haughey gave over £5 million to charity over a five-year period. In January 2011 Haughey presented a cheque for £100,000 to UNICEF ambassador Sir Alex Ferguson to support the charity's work with child flood victims in Pakistan. In 2010 alone, he made charitable donations of £1.3 million.

He was awarded an OBE in 2003 and was knighted in the 2012 Birthday Honours for services to business and philanthropy.
On 1 August 2013, it was announced he was going to be a Labour peer in the House of Lords.

Haughey has been named in several newspaper reports in connection with the resignation of Steven Purcell, the leader of Glasgow City Council until 2010.

In 2011, Haughey had planning permission for the conversion of Greenleeshill Farm, situated on greenbelt land in South Lanarkshire, with panoramic views over Glasgow into a mansion resembling the White House US presidential residence.

On 18 September 2013 he was created a life peer taking the title Baron Haughey, of Hutchesontown in the City of Glasgow.

The 2017 edition of the Sunday Times Rich List estimated his family's fortune at £265 million.

In 2018, Haughey was reported as having become involved in discussions between the Scottish Football Association and Queen's Park F.C. over the future use of Hampden Park, the stadium used by the former but owned by the latter. With the SFA threatening to move their matches to Edinburgh and unwilling to pay more than £2 million to buy Hampden from Queen's Park while the club demanded £6 million, Haughey stepped in with an offer to 'split the difference' by adding a contribution to raise the purchase offer to £4 million, in order for Scotland matches and cup finals to remain in their traditional Glasgow home. He had already donated funds to Queen's Park a decade earlier to help improve the facilities at their Lesser Hampden training ground, which would become the first team match venue in 2021 once the sale of the main stadium was completed. Also in 2018, Lord Willie Haughey has been elected overall winner of the "2018 EY Entrepreneur of the Year for Scotland".

Honours and arms
: Knight Bachelor (2012)
: Officer, Order of British Empire (2003)
Hon DTech (Honorary Doctor of Technology): Glasgow Caledonian University (2005)

References

External links
 (Archive)
UK Parliament profile
 Debrett's People of Today

Living people
1956 births
People from Gorbals
People educated at Holyrood Secondary School
Cambuslang
Scottish businesspeople
Celtic F.C. directors and chairmen
Knights Bachelor
Officers of the Order of the British Empire
Labour Party (UK) life peers
Life peers created by Elizabeth II
Scottish Labour
Directors of football clubs in Scotland
Scottish philanthropists
Labour Party (UK) donors
Businesspeople awarded knighthoods